William Paul (May 2, 1803 in St. Agnes, Cornwall, England – February 3, 1889 in Salt Lake City, Utah) was an architect in Utah.

His Devereaux House, at 334 W. South Temple St. Salt Lake City, UT, is listed on the U.S. National Register of Historic Places.

References

1803 births
1889 deaths
Architects from Salt Lake City
People from St Agnes, Cornwall
19th-century American architects
British emigrants to the United States